Derwain Jamal Easter (born 15 November 1987) is a Welsh footballer who is also a former Wales Under-21 international.

Career
Easter was born in Cardiff and joined Cardiff City as a trainee, turning professional in August 2006. On 27 October 2006, he joined Bristol Rovers on loan, where he played in three league games without scoring and one Football League Trophy game, where he scored one goal against his brother Jermaine's team, Wycombe Wanderers.

On 4 January 2007, he joined Torquay United on loan, signing at the same time as his Cardiff teammate Nick McKoy. He made his Torquay debut two days later as a second-half substitute for Matt Hockley in the 2–0 defeat at home to Southampton in the FA Cup Third Round. He was a regular in the Torquay side, but failed to impress the new managerial team of Keith Curle and Colin Lee, and returned to Cardiff at the end of his loan spell on 3 March 2007. He was released by Cardiff in May 2007.

Easter returned to Torquay United on trial in July 2007, playing the second half of the pre-season friendly against Newton Abbot. He signed for Carmarthen Town in August 2007, making 29 appearances in his first season but decided to leave the club at the end of the year. After an unsuccessful trial at Salisbury City, he signed for Newport County on 2 August 2008 following County's friendly with a Leeds United XI. Despite being involved in the first team during the opening month of the season, he was released by Newport on 31 August, returning to Carmarthen Town.

In February 2009, Easter signed on loan at Southern Football League Premier Division side Clevedon Town for the remainder of the season, scoring after two minutes on his debut in a 3–1 defeat to Banbury United. At the end of the season he signed with the club on a permanent basis. However a number of injuries restricted his playing time at the club, leading manager Nicky Tucker to propose a cut in wages which was rejected by Easter, resulting in his release in January 2010. After his release in England, he returned to Wales and signed for the 2010–11 season with Taff's Well of the Welsh First Division. In July 2011 signed for Bridgend Town and was the topscorer with Danny Thomas.

In July 2017 he joined Pontypridd Town, having also played for Rhoose.

References

External links

Welsh Premier League Profile for Jamal Easter

1987 births
Living people
Footballers from Cardiff
Wales youth international footballers
Wales under-21 international footballers
Cardiff City F.C. players
Bristol Rovers F.C. players
Torquay United F.C. players
Newport County A.F.C. players
Carmarthen Town A.F.C. players
Clevedon Town F.C. players
English Football League players
Cymru Premier players
Black British sportsmen
Association football forwards
Welsh footballers
Bridgend Town A.F.C. players
Taff's Well A.F.C. players
Pontypridd Town A.F.C. players
A.F.C. Rhoose players